This minor naval action took place in March 1665 near Goletta, Tunisia, and was a victory for a small French force of four ships and two fireships under the Duc de Beaufort over an Algerine force. Three Algerine ships were sunk, including one of 46 guns.

References

Naval battles involving France
Naval battles involving Ottoman Algeria
Conflicts in 1665
Military history of Tunisia
1660s in the Ottoman Empire
1665 in Africa